Jørgen Hammeken (20 December 1918 – 1 January 2007) was a Danish footballer. He played in six matches for the Denmark national football team from 1946 to 1947.

References

External links
 

1918 births
2007 deaths
Danish men's footballers
Denmark international footballers
Place of birth missing
Association footballers not categorized by position